Frank D. Scott Jr. (born November 18, 1983) is an American politician from the state of Arkansas. He is the mayor of Little Rock, Arkansas, serving since January 2019. Scott is a member of the Democratic Party.

Early life and education
Scott is from Southwest Little Rock. He graduated from Mann Arts and Science Magnet Middle School and Parkview Arts and Science Magnet High School. He then earned his bachelor's degree in business from the University of Memphis, where he became a brother of Alpha Phi Alpha fraternity, and his Master of Business Administration from the University of Arkansas at Little Rock.

Political career
Scott began his public service career in the office of Arkansas Governor Mike Beebe, where he served for five years, first as deputy policy director and later as director of intergovernmental affairs. Scott accepted a position as a community banker with First Security Bank, while continuing to devote significant time to serving both his city and state as a member of the Port of Little Rock Board of Directors and as a member of the Arkansas Highway Commission.

In the 2018 election, Scott ran for mayor of Little Rock. In the November 6 nonpartisan election, he led a five-candidate field with 37.11% of the vote, falling short of the 40% required to avoid a runoff election. Scott and Baker Kurrus advanced to a December 4 runoff, where Scott defeated Kurrus. Scott is the first elected African American mayor of Little Rock.

Scott was sworn in on January 1, 2019. In his first term, Scott proposed the "Rebuild the Rock" initiative, to be supported by a new sales tax to replace an expiring one. The measure was defeated in a referendum in September 2021.

Scott ran for reelection in the 2022 election. He defeated Steve Landers, with 50% of the vote.

References

External links

1983 births
21st-century American politicians
African-American mayors in Arkansas
Living people
Mayors of Little Rock, Arkansas
Members of the Arkansas State Highway Commission
University of Arkansas at Little Rock alumni
University of Memphis alumni
21st-century African-American politicians
20th-century African-American people